973 is a year in the 10th century.

973 may also refer to:
+973, the country calling code for Bahrain
Area code 973, a  telephone code for Northern New Jersey
Program 973, China's National Basic Research Program
France : departmental code for Guyane